Alcinda Manuel Honwana (born 1962) is a Mozambican anthropologist who is a Centennial Professor and the Strategic Director of the Firoz Lalji Institute for Africa at the London School of Economics and Political Science. Her research considers young people, social movements, political protests and social change. She served as a Senior Adviser for the United Nations in the Department of Economic and Social Affairs.

Early life and education 
Honwana was born in Mozambique. She completed her undergraduate studies at the Eduardo Mondlane University, specialising in history and geography. She moved to Paris for her graduate studies, working toward a master's degree (maîtrise) in sociology at the University of Paris VIII. For her doctoral studies Honwana moved to the United Kingdom, joining SOAS University of London to study social anthropology. Her early research considered post-war healing and social reintegration in Mozambique.

Research 
After completing her doctorate in 1996, Honwana was appointed a Senior Lecturer at the University of Cape Town. She served on the board of the Council for the Development of Social Science Research in Africa from 1998 to 2002. In New York she worked for the United Nations Office for Children and Armed Conflict led by Olara Otunnu. Honwana then became a Director at the Social Science Research Council in New York and held a visiting position at The New School for Social Research teaching a graduate course in Anthropology. She joined the Board of the African Studies Association in the USA and acted as an adviser for the United Nations.

In 2005 Honwana moved to the United Kingdom, where she was made Chair of International Development at the Open University. There she further developed her studies on youth politics and youth transitions adopting the term waithood, which describes the prolonged period of time African children face between childhood and adulthood. For Honwana, waithood is a period in which young people are “no longer children but not yet independent adults ... it is a precarious but also a very dynamic period in young people's lives”. Honwana has argued that youth protest movements arise from their experiences of socioeconomic and political marginalisation. In her view, the challenge for youth protest movements has  often been how to translate their aspirations beyond the street demonstrations into formal political agendas and governance action. She was made the 2007 Prince Claus Chair for Development and Equity at Institute of Social Studies and Utrecht University in the Netherlands. She delivered a TED talk in London in 2012, where she discussed how young people in Africa can be key drivers for socioeconomic and political change.

Honwana was appointed to the London School of Economics and Political Science in 2019, where she was made a Centennial Professor and the Strategic Director at LSE's Firoz Lalji Centre for Africa. Here she has led calls to decolonise the academy and to create space for new epistemologies. In 2018 Honwana delivered the Kapuscinski Development Lecture of the United Nations Development Programme, where she discussed the politics of African youth migration and social change. Alcinda Honwana received a Honorary Doctorate from Utrecht University in 2021 for her contributions to the study of youth in Africa and for bridging academic research with policymaking.

Selected publications

Books

References 

1962 births
Living people
Eduardo Mondlane University alumni
University of Paris alumni
Alumni of SOAS University of London
Academics of the London School of Economics
Mozambican women anthropologists